W110 may refer to:

Art 

 John the Baptist preaching (W110), a circa 1633/1634 painting by Rembrandt; see List of paintings by Rembrandt.

Electronics 

 The LG G Watch R, an Android-based smartwatch released in 2014.
 The Sony Cybershot DSC-W110 camera; see List of Sony Cyber-shot cameras#W series.

Games 

 Idro, a fantasy wargame published by International Team in 1980, with code W110.

Mathematics 

 Rule 110, a Turing-complete one-dimensional cellular automaton.
 The small snub icosicosidodecahedron, Wenninger number W110.

Transportation 

 The Mercedes-Benz W110, a line of midsize automobiles in the 1960s.
 The Nissan Bluebird W110/112/113 station wagon, a 1950s automobile; see Nissan Bluebird#110 series.